Nazia Mogra  is a British children's TV presenter and senior television journalist for BBC's Newsround and North West Tonight, on BBC One and BBC Sport.

Life
Nazia grew up in Preston and attended Hutton Grammar School and Edge Hill University. She has presented films for BBC's Inside Out. She has also presented for BBC Sport and BBC World News. She was a trainer for freelance journalists at UCLAN and at the BBC.

In 2015 she joined children's news programme Newsround.

References

Year of birth missing (living people)
Living people
BBC North West newsreaders and journalists
British people of Pakistani descent
Alumni of Edge Hill University
People educated at Hutton Grammar School